Procometis diplocentra is a moth of the family Autostichidae that is found in Queensland, the Australian Capital Territory, New South Wales and Victoria.

The wingspan is 19–20 mm. The forewings are ashy-whitish, densely irrorated with dark fuscous, and with scattered black scales. There are two cruciform small dark fuscous spots, transversely placed and confluent, in the disc before the middle, and a third, somewhat larger, in the disc at two-thirds. There is a series of short obscure darker marks before the hindmargin. The hindwings are fuscous-grey.

References

Procometis
Taxa named by Edward Meyrick
Moths described in 1890
Moths of Queensland